Toxocampa is a genus of moths of the family Noctuidae. The genus was erected by Achille Guenée in 1841. Lepidoptera and Some Other Life Forms and The Global Lepidoptera Names Index describe this name as a synonym of Lygephila.

Description
Its eyes are naked and without lashes. The proboscis is well developed. Palpi obliquely upturned, where the second joint reaching vertex of head and thickly and evenly scaled. Third joint short. Frons with a short tuft. Antennae minutely ciliated in male. Thorax with a slight crest behind collar. No tufts on metathorax or abdomen. Tibia spineless. Forewing with the outer margin much excurved at center. Cilia non-crenulate.

Species
Toxocampa angustipennis
Toxocampa angustissima
Toxocampa craccae
Toxocampa cucullata
Toxocampa decolor
Toxocampa dorsigera
Toxocampa enormis
Toxocampa glycyrrhizae
Toxocampa graciosissima
Toxocampa ichinosawana
Toxocampa lilacina
Toxocampa limosa
Toxocampa lubrica
Toxocampa lupina
Toxocampa lusoria
Toxocampa maxima
Toxocampa moellendorfi
Toxocampa pallida
Toxocampa pastinum
Toxocampa recta
Toxocampa stigmata
Toxocampa viciae
Toxocampa vulcanea

References

Calpinae